Marian Krzysztof Kasprzyk (born September 22, 1939 in Kołomań) is a former Polish welterweight boxer. He competed at three Olympic games, winning a gold and bronze medal.

Amateur
Kasprzyk won the Welterweight gold medal at the 1964 Tokyo Olympic Games and the Bronze Medal at the 1960 Rome Olympics as a Light Welterweight.

Olympic results
1964
Defeated Misael Vilugrón (Chile) 3-2
Defeated Sikuru Alimi (Nigeria) 5-0
Defeated Kichijiro Hamada (Japan) 5-0
Defeated Silvano Bertini (Italy) 3-2
Defeated Ričardas Tamulis (Soviet Union) 4-1

Biography
Marian Krzysztof Kasprzyk (born 22 September 1939 in Kołomań near Kielce ) - Polish boxer, Olympic champion.

His biggest success was at the Olympic games. In Rome, in 1960, he earned a bronze medal in light welterweight. In the quarterfinal he overcame the titleholder Vladimir Jengibarian from the USSR.  He was unable to take part in the semi-final fight because of a minor injury.

At the next Olympic games in Tokyo, 1964, he became an Olympic champion in welterweight. In the first round of the final fight he broke his thumb but nevertheless he lasted to the end, overcoming the favourite of the competition, then double European champion, Ričardasa Tamulis from USSR.

In Mexico, at the 1968 games, he lost in first round in light middleweight against American Armando Munizem.  Later he became a professional boxer, competing for the World Championship in light middleweight four times.

Kasprzyk started once in the European Championship. In Belgrade in 1961 he won a bronze medal in light welterweight.

Competing in the Polish Championship in 1961 he has won a bronze medal in light welterweight and also was a Polish vice-champion in 1970 in middleweight.

He represented Poland 9 times, winning 6, drawing 1 and losing 2 times.

In his boxing career he fought 270 times in total, winning 232, drawing 10, and losing 28.

Between 1961-1964 Kasprzyk was disqualified (initially lifelong, then the punishment was eased) for being convicted for participation in a fight.  The punishment was lifted shortly before the Olympic games in Tokyo, which Kasprzyk attended and has won after stiff contest with Leszek Drogosz.

This part of his biography was made into a movie called, "Boxer", directed by Julian Dziedzina, and based on a script by Bogdan Tomaszewski and Jerzy Suszko (1966). Daniel Olbrychski played in the main role.

He was an active sportsman between 1955-1976 for clubs like Sparta Ziębice, Nysa Kłodzko, and in time of his biggest success he represented BBTS Bielsko-Biała, as well as Gornik Wesol and Gornik Pszów. In 1999 he won an Aleksandra Rekszu award.

References

External links
Olympic DB
external profile at https://web.archive.org/web/20120729013443/http://www.olimpijski.pl/pl/subpages/displayfid/294_386.html

1939 births
Living people
Boxers at the 1960 Summer Olympics
Boxers at the 1964 Summer Olympics
Boxers at the 1968 Summer Olympics
Olympic boxers of Poland
Olympic gold medalists for Poland
Olympic medalists in boxing
Medalists at the 1960 Summer Olympics
Medalists at the 1964 Summer Olympics
Sportspeople from Kielce
Polish male boxers
Olympic bronze medalists for Poland
People from Kielce County
Welterweight boxers